This list of the tallest buildings in Buffalo ranks skyscrapers in Buffalo, New York by height. The tallest building in Buffalo is currently the Seneca One Tower, which stands 529 feet (161 m) tall. As of 2017, Buffalo has 17 structures taller than 250 ft (76 m).

Buffalo has a rich tradition for architecture. Among the first true skyscrapers built in the city were the Prudential (Guaranty) Building and the Ellicott Square Building, both being built in the 1890s. A number of the tallest municipal buildings in the country were also built in the city, such as Buffalo City Hall, which continues to dominate the skyline. The city is also home to a large collection of large grain elevators, many of which rise above 150 ft (46 m). Construction of high rise buildings has increased in recent years after decades of relative dormancy, in addition to the retro-fitting of many old structures.



Tallest buildings
This lists ranks Buffalo buildings that stand at least 128 feet (39 m) tall, based on standard height measurement. This includes spires and architectural details but does not include antenna masts. Existing structures are included for ranking purposes based on present height.

Tallest proposed or under construction
This lists buildings (greater than 12 floors) that have been proposed in Buffalo.

Tallest cancelled and stale proposals
This section denotes proposals that are now cancelled or the proposal has sat longer than 2 years.

Tallest destroyed buildings
This lists buildings in the city of Buffalo that once existed and rose at least 150 ft (46 m) but have since been destroyed.

Timeline of tallest buildings
This section lists buildings that once held the title of tallest building in Buffalo. Saint Paul's Episcopal Cathedral held the title twice, both before the construction and after the demolition of the original Electric Tower, which was designed as a temporary building that would only last the length of the Pan-American Exposition.

See also
 List of tallest buildings in Upstate New York

References
General
Emporis.com - Buffalo
Specific

 
 
Buffalo
Buffalo